Terry Dexter is an American contemporary R&B singer-songwriter, multi-instrumentalist, and actress.

Early life
Dexter was born in Detroit, Michigan. She has a twin sister, and she describes her ethnicity simply as multiracial. Dexter's father also a singer, exposed her to a range of music especially from Detroit born artists during her childhood such as Aretha Franklin, Stevie Wonder and Anita Baker and also other music genres such as country and jazz. She began writing songs and singing in her uncle's church gospel choir at the age of 6. Her aunt who is a gospel singer and musician taught Terry her first gospel songs.

Music career
From the age of 9 to 14, Dexter was a lead singer in the four piece band Tristar who played live all over the Detroit area and neighboring cities. She began singing background for other artists at age 11, most notably for Simply Red. At age 13 she signed to Elektra Records, but an album on the label never materialized. Dexter signed to Warner Bros. Records in 1998 in her late teens, and she released her eponymous debut album and two singles from the album,"Better Than Me" and "Strayed Away" in 1999 (although her debut single, "You'll Never Miss Me ('Til I'm Gone)" featured on the "Rush Hour" film soundtrack was released via Warner Bros. subsidiary Reprise Records). She then moved to A&M Records and was featured on the single "Magic" alongside 'The Black Eyes Peas' as part of the "Legally Blond" film soundtrack but left the label without having released an album. Dexter's critically acclaimed second album, Listen, spanned two singles and was released via Penny's Gang Records/Universal in 2008. Dexter's voice and songwriting skills has been featured on music releases by Patti Labelle, Jaheim, Eric Benet, Wynona Judd, Micheal McDonald, Eminem, Paul Taylor, Preston Glass, Will.i.am and the late great George Duke. On the electronic music genre side Terry has been featured alongside DJ/producer mavens: Roy Davis Jr, Hex Hector, Steve Hurley, Juan Hoerni, Agent X, Corvino Traxx, DJ Peran and more.

Dexter's voice and songwriting has been featured in TV and film such as, "The L Word", "Not Easily Broken" "Kings and Queens" "Burn Notice", "Cover", "The Game", "Deliver Us From Eva" "The Real O'Neals" and "Family Guy". She also co-wrote and recorded the theme song to the NBC television series The Playboy Club as well as her voice being featured on songs also featured in the show such as her soulful rendition of "Walk Like A Man" which was included on the aligning soundtrack released on Verve Records .

Acting career
Dexter made her feature film debut in Deliver Us from Eva (2003). She was later approached by film director and playwright David E. Talbert, who recruited her to star as the female lead character, Tyme Prentice, in his musical Love in the Nick of Tyme (opposite Morris Chestnut). She's appeared in indie films such as "Brickwalk Walk Cafe", "Tent City USA", and the powerful award-winning, "Battle Buddy" in the role of Sgt. Rainey. She co starred as 'Leshawna' in the feature "A Silent Cry Aloud" based on true events, as fun loving "Kim" in the newly released romantic comedy "Dating While Black" and the upcoming "The Choir Director" in the role as 'Peaches'.

Discography

Albums

Singles

Filmography

References

External links
 
 
 

1978 births
Actresses from Detroit
American film actresses
American multi-instrumentalists
American women pianists
American rhythm and blues singer-songwriters
American stage actresses
Date of birth missing (living people)
Living people
Reprise Records artists
Warner Records artists
Singers from Detroit
21st-century American women singers
21st-century American singers
21st-century American pianists
21st-century American violinists
21st-century American actresses
Singer-songwriters from Michigan